Prety may refer to:
 Pręty, Podlaskie, Poland
 Préty, Saône-et-Loire department, France

See also 
 Pretty (disambiguation)